The Shahi Eid Gah Mosque is an early 18th-century mosque located in the Pakistani city of Multan, in southern Punjab.

Location
Located on the main Multan-Lahore highway in the Northeast of the oldest part of the city. The mosque is adjacent to the 20th century Sufi shrine of Ahmad Saeed Kazmi.

History

Founding
The mosque was built in 1735 CE during the reign of Mughal Emperor Muhammad Shah. The mosque was funded by Nawab Abdul Samad Khan, who was the Mughal governor of Multan.

Sikh
Following the fall of Multan to Sikh forces, the mosque was converted into a garrison and was used for gunpowder storage. In 1848, the mosque served as site where Sikh rebels, supported by a group of 2,000 soldiers that surrounded the mosque, murdered two British emissaries. The event lead to the Siege of Multan and eventual defeat of the Sikh Empire. In subsequent fighting during the Siege of Multan, a British cannon struck the roof of the mosque, causing 40,000 pounds of gunpowder to explode, destroying a portion of the mosque.

British
The mosque was used as a court during the early British period in Multan. It was restored and returned to its original purpose in 1891 at the insistence of Deputy Commissioner H.C. Cookson.

Modern
After the independence of Pakistan, the courtyard was expanded to accommodate more worshippers.

Architecture
The mosque is spacious, with a vast courtyard and a prayer chamber measuring 250 feet by 54 feet, and features seven domes.

The mosque's exterior is embellished with glazed blue Multan-style tiles, while the interior is ornamented with intricate mosaics.

See also
 Islam in Pakistan

References

18th-century mosques
1735 establishments in Asia
Mosques in Multan
Mughal mosques